Adolphine is a female name. It is the female equivalent of the male name Adolf. It is far more rare than the male one

Prominent people with this name
Adolphine Fletcher Terry (1882–1976), American political and social activist
Adolphine Kok (1879–1928), Dutch lawyer

Adolpha

Another female equivalent of Adolf is Adolpha.  

 Louise Adolpha Le Beau, German pianist and composer.
 Adolpha Wykeham Holt, Honorary Member of the Order of the British Empire (OBE)
 Adolpha Van Meerhaeghe, film actress

See also
Adolf
Dolf (disambiguation)